Pablo Antonio Ortíz Cabezas (born 8 June 2000) is a Colombian professional footballer who plays as a centre-back for Liga Portugal 2 club Mafra, on loan from Danish Superliga club FC Midtjylland.

Career
On 4 February 2022, Ortíz was loaned out to Danish Superliga club FC Midtjylland for 18 months from América de Cali with a purchase option. However, already on 13 July 2022, Midtjylland decided to trigger the purchase option and buy him free from his contract with América de Cali, with Ortíz signing a deal with the Danish club until June 2027. On transfer deadline day, 31 January 2023, Ortíz joined Liga Portugal 2 club Mafra on a loan deal for the remainder of the season.

Career statistics

Club 

Notes

References 

Living people
2000 births
People from Tumaco
Colombian footballers
Colombian expatriate footballers
Sportspeople from Nariño Department
21st-century Colombian people
Association football defenders
Categoría Primera A players
América de Cali footballers
FC Midtjylland players
C.D. Mafra players
Colombian expatriate sportspeople in Denmark
Expatriate men's footballers in Denmark